Toy Commander is an action game for the Dreamcast developed by No Cliché and published by Sega.

A Microsoft Windows version was planned for release in 2001, but despite being almost completed, it was ultimately cancelled, due to No Cliché shutting down the following year.

Plot
The game's plot revolves around a child named Andy (Guthy in the European game, mostly referred to on screen as "Toy Commander"), who gets new army-themed toys for Christmas, and neglects his childhood favorites. The toys, led by Huggy Bear, Andy's childhood teddy bear, rebel and try to destroy the new toys.

Each boss in the game has taken over a specific area of the house, serving as one of Huggy Bear's Generals.

Gameplay
In the game, the player must complete missions by controlling toys (usually in the form of vehicles). These missions take place in rooms of a house. The game is known for its unique tasks themed around the various household areas. For instance, the first mission, which takes place in the kitchen, is a basic training level involving swapping vehicles and different types, including a helicopter, pick-up and plane. Meanwhile, the second level involves using a toy car to roll eggs over to a pot of boiling water.

The game has five basic types of playable vehicles: race cars, which are primarily used in racing missions (although some missions have the player navigating mazes in race cars), armed ground vehicles such as tanks or trucks with rocket launchers, airplanes, helicopters, and transport vehicles (which are always unarmed, but are typically used to transport various smaller toys). Not all vehicles are available for use outside of one-player, which are the unarmed and transport vehicles.

A battle mode, with other modes, is also available in the game for multiple players, allowing up to four players, with no online play.

Development
When interviewed by Official Dreamcast Magazine the game's executive producer David Chomard stated that:

Chomard said that No Cliché attempted to "avoid any comparison to Toy Story" but acknowledged that the studio were "big fans of Micro Machines, and it's true we took it as a reference of a good game with small cars". However, in a later interview with programmer Frantz Cournil it was stated that "Didier Chanfray, the art director, had the soul of a child and he loved the Toy Story computer-animated film", which led to him wanting to produce "a game in which everyone could remember their childhood and the toys they played with in their house".

Reception

The game received favorable reviews according to the review aggregation website GameRankings. Brandon Justice of IGN said, "The strong sense of atmosphere can be attributed in large part to the game's subtle but spectacular visuals," and added, "Most of the time, the game finds a nice balance between challenging and competitively frustrating." Jeff Gerstmann of GameSpot said in his early review of the game, "Toy Commander does a nice job in the graphics department. The game has an extremely frustrating learning curve, since you must get used to the control while dealing with missions that require an extremely delicate touch"; he then remarked at the end of the review, "It should make for an excellent rental, but most players won't remain interested for more than three days."

In most of the causal reviews of Toy Commander, players enjoy the graphics more than the tricky control scheme on difficult levels. Adam Pavlacka of NextGen said of the game, "If there's trouble in paradise, it's that success in a given mission is often a matter of trial and error (instructions are often vague), and playing certain stages over and over can grow tiresome. Also, the difficulty level varies widely, with seemingly impossible tasks followed by something so simple that you crack it the first try. Still, you owe it to yourself to try this one." In Japan, where the game was ported for release under the name  on January 6, 2000, Famitsu gave it a score of 25 out of 40.

No Cliché

No Cliché was a France-based game development company who created games for the Dreamcast, led by French developer Frédérick Raynal. The core team was previously established in Adeline Software International, before being bought by Sega. Adeline's parent company, Delphine Software International, retained the rights to Adeline's intellectual properties.

No Cliché was best known for its first Dreamcast title, Toy Commander, released in 1999. In 2000, it produced Toy Racer and helped Raster Productions into coding localisation for the European release of its Dreamcast Quake III Arena port. In 2001, Sega Europe stopped development on many Dreamcast European games, causing the company to cease development on its current project at the time, Agartha, a survival horror game. No Cliché remained together for a little while after the cancellation, attempting to create a PC port of Toy Commander. However, the group split before it could be finished. No Cliché went quiet, but Adeline Software continued to remain active until they were shut down in 2004. Raynal went on to work for a new developer, F4-Toys, which failed to find a publisher for their first title, Trium Planeta, and then switched to developing serious games. He then founded Ludoid, and has also begun working with Ubisoft.

Games
 Toy Commander (1999)
 Quake III Arena (2000) (European release coding localisation)
 Toy Racer (2000)
 Agartha (cancelled 2001)

Legacy

No Cliché created a special Christmas-themed demo of "Toy Commander" exclusive for Official Dreamcast Magazine. The game, entitled "Toy Commander: Christmas Surprise", appeared in both the U.K. and U.S. editions in their Holiday 2000 issues.

No Cliché also created a special summer-themed demo of "Toy Commander" exclusive for Official Dreamcast Magazine. The game, entitled "Toy Commander: Summer Special", appeared in both the U.K. and U.S. editions in special issues.

A sequel/spin-off, entitled Toy Racer, was released in Europe on December 22, 2000 for the Dreamcast. It was developed by No Cliché and published by Sega. The game also serves as an expansion to Toy Commander and its racing sections, designed exclusively for both offline and online multiplayer modes for up to four players. As a result, there is no possibility to play against AI controlled players, being the only single player features of the game both a Practice and a Time Attack modes. Toy Racer was only released in Europe at a low budget price of £5, £1 of which was designated to charity. North American and Japanese releases were planned and all set in 2001, but were cancelled for unknown reasons. It did not meet the same commercial success as its predecessor, having a much more limited single-player mode but shares similar toys, often in a different livery and using the same rooms in the house. The online functions of Toy Racer were revived as a part of the project dcserv.org on December 3, 2014.

References

External links
 
 

1999 video games
Action video games
Cancelled Windows games
Dreamcast games
Dreamcast-only games
Helicopter video games
Multiplayer and single-player video games
No Cliché games
Sega video games
Sentient toys in fiction
Tank simulation video games
Video games about toys
Video games developed in France
Christmas video games